Manathmangalam, also known as Manathumangalam is an important commercial area and an electoral ward of Perinthalmanna Municipality, Malappuram district in Kerala State of India. It's also a neighborhood of Perinthalmanna.
Manathumangalam is located in Perinthalmanna village in Perinthalmanna Taluk of Perinthalmanna Revenue Division of Malappuram District in Kerala. Manathumangalam is the second ward of Perinthalmanna Municipality. M.M Sakkeer Hussain is the current councilor of Manathumangalam.

Law and Order 
Manathumangalam falls under the jurisdiction of Perinthalmanna police station.

Educational Institutions 
1. Aided Model Lower Primary School Manathumangalam

2. Al Fathah English Medium School. Poopalam

3. Oraphanage UP School, Poopalam

4. Darul Falah English Medium School, Pooppalam

5. MSTM Arts & Science College Pooppalam

6. Al Jamia Arts & Science College Pooppalam.

Youth Clubs 

 Hiross Arts, Sports & Tourism Club Kunnumpuram, Manathumangalam.

References 

Perinthalmanna area
Villages in Malappuram district